"You & Me" is a song by British electronic music duo Disclosure, featuring vocals from Eliza Doolittle. It was released as a digital download in the United Kingdom on 28 April 2013. The track is the third single from the duo's debut studio album, Settle (2013). The song was written by Howard Lawrence, Guy Lawrence, James Napier, and Eliza Caird, and was produced by Disclosure. It has gained popularity through the Flume remix.

Music video

Background
A music video to accompany the release of "You & Me" was first released onto YouTube on 25 April 2013 at a total length of four minutes and 14 seconds.

Synopsis
The video shows a young couple (played by professional English freerunner and traceur Tim Shieff, and Lauren Johns who also appeared on Delilah's music video "Breathe") travelling across Europe, including Croatia and other locations across Europe, culminating with them partying at a Disclosure live performance at the end of the video, it also shows a poster on a wall, on the poster it says "Album coming soon". The video also shows Tim doing various Parkour moves, including running, climbing, vaulting and jumping. Eliza Doolittle does not appear in the music video while Disclosure makes a cameo at the concert.

Critical reception
Lewis Corner of Digital Spy gave the song a positive review.

In September 2019, NME included the song in their "25 essential UK garage anthems" list.

Track listings

Credits and personnel
 Lead vocals – Eliza Doolittle
 Producers – Disclosure
 Lyrics – Howard Lawrence, Guy Lawrence, James Napier, Eliza Caird
 Label: Island

Chart performance
On 5 May 2013, the song entered at number 10 on the UK Singles Chart for the week ending 11 May 2013. It also entered at number six on the UK Dance Chart, number 27 on the Scottish Singles Chart and has also charted in Belgium.

Weekly charts

For "You & Me (Flume Remix)"

Year-end charts

Certifications and sales

Release history

References

External links

2013 songs
2013 singles
Disclosure (band) songs
Eliza Doolittle (singer) songs
UK garage songs
Island Records singles
Songs written by Eliza Doolittle (singer)
Songs written by Jimmy Napes
Songs written by Guy Lawrence
Songs written by Howard Lawrence